Pisgah is an unincorporated community in Butler County, in the U.S. state of Ohio.

History
A post office called Pisgah was established in 1843, and remained in operation until 1905. The community was named for a hilltop church near the original town site, Pisgah meaning "peak" in Hebrew.

References

Unincorporated communities in Butler County, Ohio
1843 establishments in Ohio
Populated places established in 1843
Unincorporated communities in Ohio